The 2013–14 Welsh League Cup was the 22nd season of the Welsh League Cup, which was established in 1992. The format remained the same as last year with the twelve teams from the Welsh Premier League and eight feeder league clubs.

First round
The matches were played on 3 and 4 September 2013.

|}

Second round
The matches were played on 24 and 25 September 2013.

|}
Byes: Airbus UK Broughton, Caersws, Carmarthen Town and The New Saints

Third round
The matches were played on 23 and 30 October 2013.

|}

Semi-finals
The matches were played on 12 November 2013.

|}

Final
The match was played on 11 January 2014 at Park Avenue, the ground of Aberystwyth Town, 
 and was televised live by S4C Sgorio with a 3.00pm kick-off.

|}

References

External links

2013–14 Welsh League Cup results

Welsh League Cup seasons
League Cup
Wales